John Arundell, 2nd Baron Arundell of Trerice (1649 – 21 June 1698) of Trerice, Cornwall, was an English politician who sat in the House of Commons at various times between 1666 and 1687 when he inherited his peerage.

Origins
Arundell was the son and heir of Richard Arundell, 1st Baron Arundell of Trerice, by his wife Gertrude Bagge, daughter of Sir James Bagge, of Saltram, Devon, and widow of Sir Nicholas Slanning. He was baptised on 1 September 1649.

Career
In 1666 Arundell was elected Member of Parliament in the Cavalier Parliament for Truro, Cornwall, and sat until 1679. He was re-elected for Truro in 1685 and sat until 1687 when he moved to the House of Lords, having inherited the title Baron Arundell of Trerice on the death of his father.

Marriages and children
Arundell married twice:
Firstly to Margaret Acland (died 1691), daughter of Sir John Acland, 3rd Baronet (died 1655), of Columb John, Devon, by his wife Margaret Rolle, a daughter of Denys Rolle (1614–1638) of Bicton and Stevenstone in Devon, Sheriff of Devon in 1636. 
John Arundell, 3rd Baron Arundell  (1678–1706), eldest son and heir.
Secondly to Barbara Slingsby, daughter of Sir Thomas Slingsby, 2nd Baronet, of Scriven, Yorkshire, and widow of Sir Richard Mauleverer, 4th Baronet, of Allerton Mauleverer, Yorkshire, by whom he had children:
Richard Arundell (died 1759), 2nd son, MP for Knaresborough, Clerk of the Pipe, Surveyor of the Works and Master of the Mint. He married Lady Frances Manners, a daughter of John Manners, 2nd Duke of Rutland, KG, (1676–1721), but died childless.

References

1649 births
1698 deaths
Members of the Parliament of England for Truro
2
John, 2nd Baron Arundell of Trerice
English MPs 1661–1679
English MPs 1685–1687